Jari Ketomaa (born 18 April 1979) is a Finnish former rally driver.

Career

A former kart racer, Ketomaa started rallying in 1995. He made his World Rally Championship debut in 2000 at Rally Finland. He won the Group N class of the Finnish Rally Championship in 2006 and 2007. In 2008, he competed a  full season in the Production World Rally Championship, finishing the season third in the standings. Ketomaa regained the Finnish Group N title in 2009. He also made his debut in a World Rally Car at 2009 Rally Finland, finishing seventh overall. In 2010, Ketomaa is competing in the Super 2000 World Rally Championship in a Ford Fiesta S2000. In 2011 Ketomaa raced in Rally Finland with Ford Fiesta RS WRC and lead after first special stage but later retired from top 5 position.

Career results

World Rally Championship results

PWRC results

SWRC results

WRC-2 results

References

External links
Official website
 eWRC-results.com profile

Living people
1979 births
Finnish rally drivers
World Rally Championship drivers
European Rally Championship drivers